New Santa Fe is an unincorporated community in Butler Township, Miami County, in the U.S. state of Indiana.

History
New Santa Fe had its start when the Chesapeake and Ohio Railroad was extended to that point, missing the older town of Santa Fe, from which the new community took its name. The plat for New Santa Fe is dated 1902.

Geography

References

Unincorporated communities in Miami County, Indiana
Unincorporated communities in Indiana